The 2009–10 Amlin Challenge Cup pool stage was the opening stage of the 14th season of the European Challenge Cup, the second-tier competition for European rugby union clubs. It began on 8 October 2009 when Worcester Warriors hosted Montpellier and ended on 24 January 2010 with the match between Leeds Carnegie and Bourgoin.

Twenty teams participated in this phase of the competition; they were divided into five pools of four teams each, with each team playing the others home and away. Competition points were earned using the standard bonus point system. The pool winners advanced to the knockout stage, where they were joined by three entrants from the Heineken Cup pool stage. These teams then competed in a single-elimination tournament that ended with the final at the Stade Vélodrome in Marseille on 23 May 2010.

Results
All times are local to the game location.

{| class="wikitable"
|+ Key to colours
|-
|bgcolor="#ccffcc"|    
|Winner of each pool advances to quarterfinals. Seed # in parentheses.
|}

Pool 1

Pool 2

Pool 3

Pool 4

Pool 5

Seeding
 Bare numbers indicate Challenge quarterfinal seeding.
 Numbers with "HC" indicate Heineken Cup 3rd-5th Runners-Up.

See also
European Challenge Cup
2009–10 Heineken Cup

References

pool stage
2009-10